Satoko Yamada (Kanji:, born 26 February 1995) is a Japanese sports shooter. She competed in the women's 10 metre air pistol event at the 2020 Summer Olympics.

References

External links
 

1995 births
Living people
Japanese female sport shooters
Olympic shooters of Japan
Shooters at the 2020 Summer Olympics
Sportspeople from Shiga Prefecture
Shooters at the 2018 Asian Games